Kinor may refer to:

 Kinor, a Russian camera manufacturer
 Kinnor, an ancient Israelite musical instrument
Kinor David, an annual Israeli cultural award

See also
Kinora, an early motion picture device
Kinner Airplane & Motor Corporation